Panama Pacifico is a mixed-use real estate development in Veracruz, Arraiján District, Panama, located on the site of the former Howard Air Force Base. It is situated on the western bank of Panama Canal, opposite Balboa. The project has been in development since 2007.

London & Regional Properties and Colombian banker Jaime Gilinski formed a consortium, London & Regional Panama, to develop the Panama Pacifico business and residential community. Gilinski and his partners Ian and Richard Livingstone bested 17 other international firms to develop the project. The contract is a 40-year license for the area with an obligation to invest US$405 million over the first eight years from 2007.

Development goals  
The development goals set by the Panama Pacifico Agency (APP), a governmental body, at the start of the project were:
 1,400 hectares in total
 850 hectares for development
 1.0 million m2 of commercial space
 20,000 homes and apartments
 40,000 jobs created
 Extensive parks, open spaces, and entertainment areas
 Malls
 Business and luxury hotels

Housing 
The Panama Pacifico master-planned community will feature 20,000 homes in several neighborhoods: the Town Center (which includes current projects in Soleo, Mosaic, Nativa, and River Valley), Woodlands, Kobbe Hills, and Puente Verde, among others. The homes will be surrounded by the natural environment of mangroves, wetlands, and tropical forests. Luxury hotels are also planned. A downtown district, Town Center, will serve as a central point for retail, restaurant, and entertainment activities.

Economic potential 
The government of Panama created the Panama Pacifico Special Economic Area under Law 41 of July 20, 2004, and with that as a base, the Agency of Special Economic Area Panama Pacifico (APP) was created, acting as an independent entity for the administration, promotion, development, regulation, and proper use of the areas assigned to the Panama Pacifico region. Companies that are set up within the area enjoy special tax, labour, and legal incentives. A number of multinational corporations have already located in Panama Pacifico, including 3M, DELL, VF, BASF, Samtec, and Caterpillar.

Panama Pacifico is located 15 minutes from downtown Panama City, 35 minutes from Tocumen International Airport, and adjacent to the Pan-American Highway that connects the Americas.

By the end of 2012, the community is expected to complete ten new warehouse buildings in the Pan America Corporate Center and four Class A office buildings in the International Business Park. The developer has invested $230 million so far, and Kardonski says international firms—particularly those involved in the maritime, light manufacturing, and technology sectors—continue to find Panama Pacifico an attractive option for their Latin American operations. More than 160 companies are now in operation in the Special Economic Area, including eight on the Fortune 500.

Education

Panama Pacifico hosts several educational institutions, including:
 Lycée français Paul Gauguin de Panama, a private international school offering Pre-K through 12th grade. Classes are primarily in French, with both English and Spanish as second languages.
 Howard Kids Academy, a private school with pre-school through 8th grade, including classes in English as a Second Language (ESL).
 Magen David Academy, a private school for children of the Jewish faith, offering pre-K through 12th grade. Classes are in English.
 Knightsbridge Schools International Panama, a private school with Pre-K through 12th grade.
 Universidad del Caribe, a four-year college. Classes are in Spanish.
 Universidad Tecnológica de Panamá, a four-year college. Classes are in Spanish.

See also
List of former United States military installations in Panama

Footnotes

External links
 Official website

Populated places in Panamá Oeste Province
Buildings and structures under construction in Panama